Martin Puza (born 23 January 1970) is an Austrian former footballer.

References

1970 births
Living people
Association football defenders
Austrian footballers
Austrian Football Bundesliga players
SK Rapid Wien players
LASK players
Grazer AK players